Luiz Gustavo Benmuyal Reis (born 2 September 1999), better known as just Luiz Gustavo, is a Brazilian professional footballer who plays as a right-back for Portuguese club Gondomar on loan from Arouca.

Career
Luis Gustavo began his career in Brazil with Clube do Remo.He made his professional debut with Remo in a 1–0 Campeonato Brasileiro Série C win over Globo on 21 April 2018. From there, he moved to the reserves of Cruzeiro without making a senior appearance. On 4 June 2020, he transferred to the Portuguese club Arouca.

Honours

Remo
Campeonato Paraense: 2018

References

External links
 
 

1999 births
Sportspeople from Belém
Living people
Brazilian footballers
Association football fullbacks
Clube do Remo players
Cruzeiro Esporte Clube players
F.C. Arouca players
Pevidém S.C. players
Gondomar S.C. players
Campeonato Brasileiro Série C players
Liga Portugal 2 players
Campeonato de Portugal (league) players
Brazilian expatriate footballers
Brazilian expatriate sportspeople in Portugal
Expatriate footballers in Portugal